Patrick O'Reilly (1911–2003) was an Irish Fianna Fáil politician. Born in Aughavas, County Leitrim, where he was a farmer, he later moved to Firmullagh, Moyne, County Longford. He served as a member of Leitrim County Council from 1942 to 1955. O'Reilly was elected to Seanad Éireann as a Fianna Fáil Senator on the Agricultural Panel in 1944. He was re-elected at each subsequent Seanad election until he lost his seat in 1969.

References

1911 births
2003 deaths
Fianna Fáil senators
Members of the 5th Seanad
Members of the 6th Seanad
Members of the 7th Seanad
Members of the 8th Seanad
Members of the 9th Seanad
Members of the 10th Seanad
Members of the 11th Seanad
Politicians from County Longford
Irish farmers
Local councillors in County Leitrim